Kalen is a village in Prilep Municipality in North Macedonia. It used to be part of the former municipality of Vitolište.

Demographics
According to the 2002 census, the village had a total of 19 inhabitants. Ethnic groups in the village include:

Macedonians 19

References

Villages in Prilep Municipality